dSniff is a set of password sniffing and network traffic analysis tools written by security researcher and startup founder Dug Song to parse different application protocols and extract relevant information. dsniff, filesnarf, mailsnarf, msgsnarf, urlsnarf, and webspy passively monitor a network for interesting data (passwords, e-mail, files, etc.). arpspoof, dnsspoof, and macof facilitate the interception of network traffic normally unavailable to an attacker (e.g., due to layer-2 switching). sshmitm and webmitm implement active man-in-the-middle attacks against redirected SSH and HTTPS sessions by exploiting weak bindings in ad-hoc PKI.

Overview
The applications sniff usernames and passwords, web pages being visited, contents of an email, etc. As the name implies, dsniff is a network sniffer, but it can also be used to disrupt the normal behavior of switched networks and cause network traffic from other hosts on the same network segment to be visible, not just traffic involving the host dsniff is running on.

It handles FTP, Telnet, SMTP, HTTP, POP, poppass, NNTP, IMAP, SNMP, LDAP, Rlogin, RIP, OSPF, PPTP MS-CHAP, NFS, VRRP, YP/NIS, SOCKS, X11, CVS, IRC, AIM, ICQ, Napster, PostgreSQL, Meeting Maker, Citrix ICA, Symantec pc Anywhere, NAI Sniffer, Microsoft SMB, Oracle SQL*Net, Sybase and Microsoft SQL protocols.

The name "dsniff" refers both to the package as well as an included tool. The "dsniff" tool decodes passwords sent in cleartext across a switched or unswitched Ethernet network. Its man page explains that Dug Song wrote dsniff with "honest intentions - to audit my own network, and to demonstrate the insecurity of cleartext network protocols." He then requests, "Please do not abuse this software."

These are the files that are configured in dsniff folder /etc/dsniff/

/etc/dsniff/dnsspoof.hosts  Sample hosts file.
If no host file is specified, replies will be forged for all address queries on the LAN with an answer of the local machine’s IP address.

/etc/dsniff/dsniff.magic  Network protocol magic

/etc/dsniff/dsniff.services  Default trigger table

The man page for dsniff explains all the flags. To learn more about using dsniff, you can explore the Linux man page.

This is a list of descriptions for the various dsniff programs. This text belong to the
dsniff “README” written by the author, Dug Song.

See also

Comparison of packet analyzers
EtherApe, a network mapping tool that relies on sniffing traffic
netsniff-ng, a free Linux networking toolkit
Network tap
Ngrep, a tool that can match regular expressions within the network packet payloads
tcpdump, a packet analyzer
Tcptrace, a tool for analyzing the logs produced by tcpdump
Wireshark, a GUI based alternative to tcpdump

References

External links
Official website
Dunston, Duane, Linuxsecurity.com, “And away we spoof!!!” http://www.linuxsecurity.com/docs/PDF/dsniff-n-mirror.pdf

Network analyzers
Password cracking software
Free network management software